Moustapha Sonko (born 14 June 1972 in Paris, France) is a former professional basketball player from France

Professional career
Sonko was the French 2nd Division French Player's MVP in 1993. He was the French 1st Division's French Player's MVP, in 2000.

National team career
Sonko won the silver medal at the 2000 Summer Olympics, with the senior French national basketball team.

External links

1972 births
Living people
Basketball players at the 2000 Summer Olympics
CB Lucentum Alicante players
Baloncesto Málaga players
Élan Béarnais players
French expatriate basketball people in Spain
French men's basketball players
HTV Basket players
Levallois Sporting Club Basket players
Liga ACB players
Medalists at the 2000 Summer Olympics
Olympic basketball players of France
Olympic medalists in basketball
Olympic silver medalists for France
Real Madrid Baloncesto players
Basketball players from Paris